Aleisha Rose Groth (born September 11, 1988) is an Australian actress. She lives in Brisbane, Queensland. She played Tina the doll on Toybox and featured in Arrowhead (2015) directed by Jesse O'Brien. Rose spent most of her life training as a ballet dancer and musical theatre performer. Upon graduating, Rose became a dancer with the Walt Disney Company, but became involved in acting and was accepted into NIDA in 2011, an Australian acting school.

Filmography

Personal life

Relationships
In 2019, Rose married Christopher Peever DiLoreto, whom she had met in high school before graduation in 2005.

References

External links
 

Actresses from Brisbane
Living people
The Amazing Race contestants
1988 births